Hull Heads is a coastal town and locality in the Cassowary Coast Region, Queensland, Australia.

Geography 
The locality is mostly located on the southern side of the Hull River with the town of Hull Heads on the southern headland near the mouth of the river.

Googarra Beach is a second town within the locality on the beach near the locality's southern boundary which has yet to be developed.

History 
It was originally named Googarra until renamed Hull by the Queensland Place Names Board on 1 November 1963. The town take its name from the Hull River, which in turn was named after surveyor Alfred Arthur Hull, who worked in the area from 1870 to 1872.

Googarra is believed to be a corruption of the Aboriginal name Galmora, known by Europeans as Jackey Jackey who was a member of Edmund Kennedy's exploration of Cape York Peninsula; the town of Googarra Beach was named by Queensland Place Names Board on 1 November 1963.

Education 
There are no schools in Hull Heads. The nearest government primary school is Lower Tully State School in neighbouring Lower Tully to the south-east. The nearest government secondary school is Tully State High School in Tully to the north-west.

References

External links 
 
 

Towns in Queensland
Cassowary Coast Region
Coastline of Queensland
Localities in Queensland